Leptanillinae is a subfamily of ants. They are further divided into the tribes Anomalomyrmini and Leptanillini.

In all Leptanillini, the larvae feed their hemolymph to the queen through specialized processes on their prothoraces and third abdominal segments. This behavior resembles that of the unrelated Adetomyrma, also called Dracula ants, which pierce their larvae to obtain body fluids.

At least Leptanilla and Phaulomyrma are minute, yellow, blind ants that live below the surface.

Distribution 
The Leptanillinae are mainly spread out in tropical and warm temperate regions in Europe and Australian regions.

Systematics
 Anomalomyrmini Bolton, 1990
 Anomalomyrma Taylor, 1990
 Furcotanilla Xu, 2012
 Protanilla Taylor, 1990
 Leptanillini Emery, 1910
 Leptanilla Emery, 1870
 Phaulomyrma G.C. Wheeler & E.W. Wheeler, 1930
 Yavnella Kugler, 1987

References

External links

 
Ant subfamilies
Taxa named by Carlo Emery